Edward E. Coughlin (August 5, 1861 – December 25, 1952) was a Major League Baseball outfielder and pitcher. Coughlin played in one game for the Buffalo Bisons on May 15, .

Coughlin was born in Hartford, Connecticut, to Irish parents. On May 15, 1884, he made his first and only appearance in a major league game for the Buffalo Bisons of the National League. Buffalo played the Philadelphia Quakers. He was used as both an outfielder and a pitcher in that game. As a pitcher, he faced five batters, allowed four runs, three of them earned, and threw two wild pitches. He left the mound without recording an out. In the outfield, he recorded two putouts, and made one error. At the plate, Coughlin batted four times, struk out twice, and collected a hit. He also drove in a run.

He played for both Youngstown of the Iron & Oil Association and Hartford in the Connecticut State League in 1884. In 1886, he played in the New England League with the Brockton ball club. He died in Hartford in 1952 at the age of 91. He is buried at Mount St. Benedict Cemetery in Bloomfield, Connecticut.

References

External links

Retrosheet
 Ed Coughlin Memorial at Find a Grave

1861 births
1952 deaths
Buffalo Bisons (NL) players
Major League Baseball pitchers
Baseball players from Hartford, Connecticut
Youngstown (minor league baseball) players
Hartford (minor league baseball) players
Brockton (minor league baseball) players
19th-century baseball players